Sohail Ahmed may also refer to:

 Sohail Ahmed (comedian) (born 1963), Pakistani comedian
 Sohail Ahmed (cricketer) (born 1985), Pakistani first-class cricketer
 Sohail Ahmed (boxer) (born 1979), Pakistani boxer
 Sohail Ahmed (former Islamist), reformed former radical Islamist